Lyudmyla Kichenok and Polina Pekhova were the defending champions, having won the event in 2013, but both players chose not to participate.

Hiroko Kuwata and Mari Tanaka won the tournament, defeating Nao Hibino and Prarthana Thombare in the final, 6–1, 6–4.

Seeds

Draw

References 
 Draw

Fergana Challenger - Women's Doubles
Fergana Challenger